"Too Much to Ask" is a song recorded by Irish singer and songwriter Niall Horan. It was written by Horan and Jamie Scott, with production handled by Greg Kurstin. The song was released by Capitol Records on 15 September 2017, as the third single from Horan's debut studio album, Flicker (2017). Commercially, "Too Much to Ask" reached the top 10 in Hungary, Ireland, and Scotland as well as the top 20 in Australia, Belgium, Lebanon, Malaysia, the Netherlands, and Slovakia.

Background
Horan expressed in tweets that the song is "very special" to him and it stands out as one of his favourites on the album. He said of the song in an interview with BBC News: "I would obviously like it to go to number one, that would be the dream, but it is what it is. If it's getting a lot love and jumps in at number two or number three, I don't mind." In the single's promotional post on social media, Horan was pictured standing on the left on the escalator in the London Underground. "It's a special one. I actually wrote this song the day after I wrote 'This Town' so I felt like it got off to an alright start when I started writing the album. It's a very nice, beautiful song and means a lot to me. I just can't wait for people to hear it. Hopefully fingers cross that people are going to like it, obviously a lot different to 'Slow Hands'," Horan explained in a Smallzy's Surgery interview.

Composition
"Too Much to Ask" is performed in the key of C major. Horan's vocals span from G2 to F4.

Critical reception
Mike Wass of Idolator was positive about the song, saying: "Niall Horan's solo career continues to go from strength to strength with the arrival of 'Too Much To Ask.' A tender ballad about hankering for an ex, the track showcases the Irishman's simple, heartfelt approach." And went on to call it "a beautifully crafted song" with a "melancholy piano arrangement". Rianne Houghton from Digital Spy was also positive about the song, and said: "Gird your loins, and your tear ducts 1D fans! Niall has released his latest single and it's definitely a tear-jerker. Seriously Niall, who hurt you?"

Music video
Niall uploaded the official audio on day of release to his YouTube Vevo account and then the official music video six days later on 21 September 2017. It was directed by Malia James. Jon Blistein of Rolling Stone explained the video in his review about the song's video, writing:"The Malia James-directed clip finds Horan grappling with lost love as he sings the poignant and nostalgic lyrics in an empty room and watches a couple flirt and kiss on the tube. Horan finds solace while sharing a pint and playing the tune with his mates, though the clip ends with the musician contending with loneliness as he wanders the streets of London."

Track listing

Personnel
Credits adapted from Tidal.
 Niall Horan – songwriting
 Jamie Scott – songwriting, background vocals
 Greg Kurstin – production, keyboard, bass guitar, drums, guitar, piano, recording engineering
 Michael Freeman – assistant mixing
 Spike Stent – mixing, programming
 Alex Pasco – recording engineering
 Julian Burg – recording engineering

Charts

Weekly charts

Year-end charts

Certifications

Release history

References

2010s ballads
2017 singles
2017 songs
Niall Horan songs
Capitol Records singles
Songs written by Niall Horan
Songs written by Jamie Scott
Song recordings produced by Greg Kurstin